The Tunisia national beach handball team, nicknamed Les Aigles de Carthage (The Eagles of Carthage or The Carthage Eagles), is the national handball team of Tunisia. It is governed by the Tunisian Handball Federation and takes part in international beach handball competitions.

Competitive record
 Champions   Runners-up   Third Place   Fourth Place  

Red border color indicates tournament was held on home soil.

World Championship

World Games

World Beach Games

Mediterranean Beach Games

African Beach Games

Current squad 

Marwane SoussiMohamed MaaouiaAimen TouziNassim OujiOussama KhezamiMarwen ChetiouiAhmed SfarHamza FallehChahine Ferchichi Coach: Mohamed Tabboubi

See also
Tunisia women's national beach handball team
Tunisia men's national handball team
Tunisia men's national junior handball team
Tunisia men's national youth handball team

References

External links
Official website
IHF profile

National team
National sports teams of Tunisia
National beach handball teams